
The Réaumur scale (°Ré, °Re, °r), also known as the "octogesimal division", is a temperature scale for which the melting and boiling points of water are defined as 0 and 80 degrees respectively.  The scale is named for René Antoine Ferchault de Réaumur, who first proposed a similar scale in 1730.

Change in scale 
Réaumur's thermometer contained diluted alcohol (ethanol) and was constructed on the principle of using 0° for the melting temperature of water, and graduating the tube into degrees, each of which was one-thousandth of the volume contained by the bulb and tube up to the zero mark. He suggested that the concentration of alcohol employed be such that it began boiling at 80 °Ré – that is, when it had expanded in volume by 8%. He chose alcohol instead of mercury because it expands more visibly, but this posed problems: his original thermometers were very bulky, and the low boiling point of alcohol made them unsuitable for many applications. Instrument-makers generally chose different liquids, and then used 80 °Ré to signify the boiling point of water, causing much confusion. During 1772 Jean-André Deluc studied the several substances then used in thermometers and concluded that mercury thermometers were the best for practical use; for example, if two equal amounts of water at x and y degrees were mixed, the temperature of the result was then the average of x and y degrees, and this relationship was only reliable when mercury was used. From the late 18th century mercury was used almost without exception. Its range is 0 to 80 degrees.

Use 
The Réaumur scale was used widely in Europe, particularly in France, Germany and Russia, and was referenced in the works of Thomas Mann, Dostoyevsky, Flaubert, Joyce, Tolstoy, and Nabokov. For example, at the beginning of Book X of The Brothers Karamazov, the narrator says, "We had eleven degrees of frost", i.e. −11 °Ré, equivalent to −14 °C or 7 °F.  By the 1790s, France had chosen the Celsius scale as part of the metric system, rather than the Réaumur measurement, but it was used commonly in some parts of Europe until at least the mid-19th century, and in parts of Russia until the early 20th.  While living in Paris, George Orwell mentions "translating Réaumur into Fahrenheit" even in 1929. Its main modern uses are in some Italian and Swiss factories for measuring milk temperature during cheese production, and in the Netherlands for measuring temperature when cooking sugar syrup  for desserts and sweets.

Conversion between different temperature units

Notes and references

Obsolete units of measurement
Scales of temperature
Science and technology in France
Scales in meteorology